California Pines is a census-designated place in Modoc County, California. It lies at an elevation of 4406 feet (1343 m). Its population is 473 as of the 2020 census, down from 520 from the 2010 census.

Geography
According to the United States Census Bureau, the CDP covers an area of 7.6 square miles (19.6 km), 98.13% of it land, and 1.87% of it water.

Demographics

At the 2010 census California Pines had a population of 520. The racial makeup of California Pines was 416 (80.0%) White, 11 (2.1%) African American, 16 (3.1%) Native American, 6 (1.2%) Asian, 2 (0.4%) Pacific Islander, 33 (6.3%) from other races, and 36 (6.9%) from two or more races. Hispanic or Latino of any race were 83 people (16.0%).

The whole population lived in households, no one lived in non-institutionalized group quarters and no one was institutionalized.

There were 216 households, 63 (29.2%) had children under the age of 18 living in them, 96 (44.4%) were opposite-sex married couples living together, 25 (11.6%) had a female householder with no husband present, 14 (6.5%) had a male householder with no wife present.  There were 10 (4.6%) unmarried opposite-sex partnerships, and 4 (1.9%) same-sex married couples or partnerships. 66 households (30.6%) were one person and 33 (15.3%) had someone living alone who was 65 or older. The average household size was 2.41.  There were 135 families (62.5% of households); the average family size was 2.98.

The age distribution was 129 people (24.8%) under the age of 18, 35 people (6.7%) aged 18 to 24, 79 people (15.2%) aged 25 to 44, 172 people (33.1%) aged 45 to 64, and 105 people (20.2%) who were 65 or older.  The median age was 47.2 years. For every 100 females, there were 108.8 males.  For every 100 females age 18 and over, there were 99.5 males.

There were 276 housing units at an average density of 36.5 per square mile, of the occupied units 183 (84.7%) were owner-occupied and 33 (15.3%) were rented. The homeowner vacancy rate was 3.7%; the rental vacancy rate was 10.8%.  436 people (83.8% of the population) lived in owner-occupied housing units and 84 people (16.2%) lived in rental housing units.

Politics

References

Census-designated places in Modoc County, California
Census-designated places in California